Precinct may refer to:
 An electoral precinct
 A police precinct
 A religious precinct
 A shopping precinct or shopping mall
 A Pedestrian zone

Places 
 A neighborhood, in Australia
 A unit of public housing in Singapore
 A former electoral subdivision of the wards of the City of London that elected a Common Councilman
 A Texas electoral district that elects a member of a commissioners' court or a Texas constable
 A minor civil division in certain US states including Nebraska and Illinois
 See List of precincts in Illinois
 Precinct, Missouri
 Upper and Lower Precinct, a pedestrianised shopping area in Coventry, England

Arts 
 The Precinct, a 2010 movie